Fairchildia panamensis is a species of flowering plants in the family Fabaceae. It belongs to the subfamily Faboideae. It is the only member of the genus Fairchildia.

References

Swartzieae
Monotypic Fabaceae genera